Rithika Tamil Selvi is an Indian Tamil actress . She is well known for appearing on the comedy-cooking show Cooku With comali. She is the first runner-up of the comedy reality show Comedy Raja Kalakkal Rani.

Career
Rithika first appeared in the TV serial as an actress Raja Rani in 2018 playing a character named Vinothini. After her debut she played a major role in another Vijay TV serial called Baakiyalakshmi in 2020. In 2021, she participated as a contestant in the popular comedy cooking show Cooku With Comali. In 2021, she also appeared in many special show's. She later also appeared in reality shows such as Nammavar Kamal, Start Music (season 2) and Comedy Raja Kalakkal Rani which she emerged as the first runner-up.

Personal life
In 2022, Rithika married a business man named Vinu.

Television

References

External links

Living people
1995 births
21st-century Indian actresses
Indian television actresses
Actresses in Tamil television